Bear vs. Shark are an American post-hardcore band from Highland, Michigan. They were founded in 2001 and disbanded in 2005 after releasing one EP and two full-length studio albums while signed to Equal Vision Records. The band later reunited for some shows in 2016.

Formation
The members of the group have known each other all their lives with some members forming friendships as early as pre-school. The band formed during their college years when the members were playing in separate projects. The group's original drummer Brandon Moss left the group and was replaced by Ashley Horak. The group has cited classic rock and punk as well as The Clash, Fugazi, and Motown as influences to the group's  sound.

The group initially sent a demo to Equal Vision Records and a representative from the label flew out immediately to sign the group. Since the release of Right Now You're in the Best of Hands... the band has toured the United States extensively headlining & opening for other major acts such as Coheed and Cambria. The group quickly gained attention from fans and fellow musicians as well. The group is also known for their high-energy stage show most notably by Marc Paffi, who is known to move around the stage frantically during performances. Most of the band members also switched playing instruments during their sets, which was a regular occasion. Though it has been circulated that the band's name comes from the shape of Michigan, Gaviglio has said in an interview that they believed it was "super badass and sounded interesting."

Break-up
On December 21, 2005 the band posted on their website that they decided to call it quits. Although the band didn't cite any specific reason for the breakup John Gaviglio was featured in the April 2006 issue of Alternative Press where he did an op-ed piece on the hardships of touring extensively. The band has also been very vocal that they didn't like their touring conditions.

Reunion
On May 22, 2016 the band announced a reunion show to benefit Flintkids.org in Flint, Michigan, which later followed with a small string of additional dates. Equal Vision Records also released info on a re-issuing of the band's two full-length albums on a joint vinyl release.

On May 27, 2017 band played at Bled Fest festival.

Post Bear vs. Shark
The band contributed a track called "Victoria Iceberg" to the Masters of Horror Soundtrack.

Marc Paffi is also lead singer of Bars of Gold with fellow member Brandon Moss.

Mike Muldoon and John Gaviglio together with help of Mark Maynard have started a band project called Cannons, centralized in Brooklyn.

Right Now, You're in the Best of Hands... and Terrorhawk were released on vinyl by Friction Records, with Right Now, You're in the Best of Hands included two previously unreleased tracks, "California Hot Seat" (originally heard on the (1653 EP) and "June 7". Also, a special picture disc version of Terrorhawk was released, with artwork by Jeff VandenBerg.

Marc Paffi recorded vocals for the song "1999" on the band If He Dies He Dies release Conquistador on Friction Records.

Marc Paffi, Mike Muldoon, and Brandon Moss started a band together called Champions of History.

Brandon Moss is also a member of the band Wildcatting. In addition to Wildcatting, Brandon Moss also plays horns in Don't Stand So Close To Me, a jazz/fusion ensemble that mixes solid hits from The Police.

John Gaviglio played in Matthew Dear's Big Hands

Band members
Final line-up
Marc Paffi – lead vocals, guitar, keyboards
Derek Kiesgen – guitar, bass
Mike Muldoon – guitar, bass, keyboards
John Gaviglio – guitar, bass, backing vocals
Ashley Horak – drums (2003 - 2005)

Past members
 Brandon Moss – drums (2001 - 2003)

2016 line-up
Marc Paffi – lead vocals, guitar, keyboards
Derek Kiesgen – guitar, bass
Nick Jones – guitar, bass, keyboards
John Gaviglio – guitar, bass, backing vocals
Brandon Moss – drums, percussion
Ashley Horak – drums, percussion, piano, backing vocals

Discography
Studio albums
Right Now, You're in the Best of Hands. And If Something Isn't Quite Right, Your Doctor Will Know in a Hurry (2003, Equal Vision Records)
Terrorhawk (2005, Equal Vision Records)

EPs
1653 (2001, Self Released)

Compilations
Right Now, You're in the Best of Hands/Terrorhawk Joint Vinyl (2016, Equal Vision Records)

Music videos
 Catamaran (2005)

References

External links
Bear vs. Shark on Facebook

American post-hardcore musical groups
Musical groups from Michigan
Hardcore punk groups from Michigan
Musical groups established in 2001
Musical groups disestablished in 2005
Equal Vision Records artists
Musical quintets
2001 establishments in Michigan
Oakland County, Michigan